A Todo Rock is Menudo's thirteenth album in Spanish.  It features Ricky Meléndez, Johnny Lozada, Charlie Massó, and new members Ray Reyes, who replaced Xavier Serbiá after Xavier reached the age limit and Roy Rosselló, who  replaced Miguel Cancel after Miguel decided to quit the group. This was the first time that a member decided to leave before his time was due. According to an interview made in 1998, Miguel was unhappy that he was not able to sing his songs after a sudden voice change and opted to leave before his scheduled departure, thus being replaced by Roy. This is the last album that Johnny Lozada recorded as a member of the group.
Robby Rosa (also known as Draco Rosa), sang in this album but was not credited for it. He later would become part of Menudo. The album was the first Menudo's album to sell over 1 million copies worldwide.

Track listing

 Side A.

 "Indianápolis". (Alejandro Monroy, Carlos Villa). - 03:35 - Singer: Charlie Massó.
 "Piel De Manzana". (Edgardo Díaz, A. Monroy, M. Pagan, C. Villa). - 03:33 - Singer : Charlie Massó
 "Chicle De Amor". (A. Monroy, C. Villa). - 02:43 - Singer: Ray Reyes
 "Una Buena Razón". (Díaz, Monroy, Villa). - 02:42 - Singer: Johnny Lozada
 "Todo Va Bien".  (A. Monroy, C. Villa). - 03:11 - Singer: Charlie Massó

 Side B.

 "Si Tú No Estás". (Díaz, Monroy, Villa). - 04:28 - Singer: Ray Reyes
 "Amor En Bicicleta". (Díaz, Monroy, Villa). - 03:36 - Singer : Ricky Meléndez
 "Zumbador". (A. Monroy, C. Villa). - 03:12 - Singer: Ray Reyes
 "Ladrón De Amor". (Monroy, Villa). - 02:06 - Singer: Johnny Lozada
 "No Te Reprimas". (Díaz, Monroy, Villa). - 03:01 - Singer: Charlie Massó

References

Menudo (band) albums
1983 albums